SS. Cyril and Methodius Parish - one of the Polish-American Roman Catholic parishes in New England in the Archdiocese of Hartford.  Founded on April 6, 1902, it is designated for Polish immigrants in Hartford, Connecticut, United States.

History
In January 1901, the recently ordained Fr. Stanislaus Lozowski was assigned as curate to serve the Polish immigrants at St. Peter Parish. On April 6, 1902, Bishop of Hartford Michael Tierney established SS. Cyril and Methodius Parish for Polish immigrants, with Fr. Lozowski appointed founding pastor. The first parish Mass was celebrated in St. Peter's basement. A small wooden church was dedicated on Governor St. The cornerstone of a large brick church was blessed on July 9, 1916.

Clergy

Current
Rev. Adam Hurbanczuk, Pastor, November 4, 2011 – Present.
Rev. Andrzej Pogorzelski, Vicar, November 4, 2011 – Present.

Former Pastors
Rev. Stanislaus Lozowski 
Rev. William Przybylo, 1990–2008
Rev. Adam C. Subocz, 2008 - October 2011
Rev. Adam Hurbanczuk, November 2011 - Present

Former Vicars
Rev. Kazimirerz Heisig, Vicar † - September 2011.

† = deceased

Sources

The Official Catholic Directory in USA

External links
SS. Cyril and Methodius Church - Parish Website
SS. Cyril and Methodius - Diocesan information
SS. Cyril and Methodius - ParishesOnline.com
Archdiocese of Hartford

Polish-American Roman Catholic parishes in Connecticut
Roman Catholic churches in Hartford, Connecticut
1902 establishments in Connecticut